Four Horsemen of the Apocalypse is the name given by gambling authors to the four U.S. Army engineers who first discovered in the 1950s the best playing strategy in the casino game of Blackjack that can be  formulated on the basis of the player's and the dealer's cards. The so-called Basic Strategy, which was subsequently refined through the use of computers and combinatorial analysis,  loses the least money to the casino in the long term.

History
In 1953, Roger Baldwin, a private in the U.S. Army with a master's degree in mathematics from Columbia University, stationed in  Aberdeen Proving Ground, the U.S. Army's oldest active proving ground, was playing dealer's choice poker in the barracks. After a player acting as dealer selected Blackjack, someone remarked that the dealer, as they do in the Las Vegas casinos, would have to stand on 17 and hit on 16. Baldwin was intrigued by this news enough to embark on a project during his off-work hours to discover the optimal playing strategy for the player on the basis of the player's and the dealer's cards, as well as the rules dictating the dealer's play. For this, Baldwin asked the help of Wilbert Cantey, a sergeant at the facility, who had left the seminary  because of his hustling at pool and cards and pursued a master's degree in Mathematics. They enlisted the help of privates Herbert Maisel, who later became a professor at Georgetown University, and James McDermott, who had a master's from Columbia University.

For their project, the four Army men used only the desk calculators available at the military base, which were called at the time “adding machines.” The result of their work was presented in an analytical study in the Journal of the American Statistical Association, in September 1956, and subsequently in a book titled Playing Blackjack to Win that was published in 1957. The book, with a foreword written by TV quiz-show star Charles Van Doren, contained a pull-out strategy chart with sections on Draw or Stand, Doubling Down, and Splitting Pairs.

The book did include, in a chapter titled "Using the Exposed Cards to Improve Your Chances", the first  valid card-counting system ever published, but their method was not strong enough to offer a positive-expectation strategy for the player, although it did offer the least costly strategy in the game of casino Blackjack. A gambling expert has claimed that any player who uses the Four Horsemen's basic strategy today "would not be giving up more than a few hundredths of a percent [of expected value] over perfect basic strategy."

Legacy
The four originators of Blackjack's Basic Strategy went on with their lives away from casinos and gambling, dedicating themselves to scientific research, teaching and business. 
But their work caused an immediate sensation in gambling research as well as among professional gamblers. MIT Professor of Mathematics Edward O. Thorp tested their strategy on the university's IBM computers and found it to be accurate "within a couple of hundredths of a percentage point." Thorp went on to formulate the first strong card counting strategy and tested it in actual casino play, in trips he took to Las Vegas, often accompanied by Claude Shannon, who is sometimes referred to as "father of information theory".

The existence of a casino-beating system spread throughout the American gambling and casino circles, and in 1962, E. O. Thorp published his "seminal" work Beat The Dealer, widely considered to be the original Blackjack manual. The book sold over 700,000 copies and earned a place in the New York Times bestseller list. The publication and subsequent notoriety of the book was the cause at the time behind many casinos changing the rules and conditions of how Blackjack was offered – for example, they stopped dealing single-deck Blackjack down to the last card. After players began complaining, most casinos went back to the previous rules and conditions. The tables were soon full of casual gamblers who believed that by they could now "beat the house," even though most of them never strictly followed Thorp's "complicated," two-parallel-counts system, or even the simpler systems that subsequently appeared, such as High-Low, and the casinos started winning more money than before Thorp's book had appeared.

Thorp's work in turn inspired the research and the exploits of professional blackjack players such as Stanford Wong, Ken Uston, and the MIT Blackjack Teams of the 1990s, as well as many others.

Recognition
In 1965, in an early recognition of the impact that the work of the four U.S. Army men would have on the game of 21, gambling author Dr. Allan N. Wilson labelled them "The Four Horsemen of the Apocalypse" in his book The Casino Gambler’s Guide.

On the night of 4 January 2008, during Max Rubin's 12th annual Blackjack Ball, held in Las Vegas, the Four Horsemen were inducted into the Blackjack Hall of Fame.

During the Ball's festivities, Stanford Wong commented: "Thorp never would have got there without the work of these guys. If Thorp never got there, I don't know that any of us would be here. I don't know how many millions of dollars just the people in this room have made as a result of the work that these guys did." And Max Rubin stated, “If it wasn't for them, not one of us would be in this room." Former member of the MIT Team Johnny Chang said, "When I first read the 1957 article they wrote that appeared in the Journal of the American Statistical Association with an accurate basic strategy, I couldn't fathom how they had accomplished this using desk calculators. It just seemed impossible."

Later in 2008, on the 50th anniversary of its first edition, the book Playing Blackjack to Win was reprinted in the US, with a foreword written by E. O. Thorp, and an introduction by Arnold Snyder. In his foreword, Thorp wrote: "To paraphrase Isaac Newton, if I have seen farther than others it is because I stood on the shoulders of four giants.

Personal lives and deaths
Wilbert Eddie "Preach" Cantey, who'd worked his whole life on calculators and mainframe as well as personal computers, died on 21 May 2008 at the age of 77 at the Genesis Layhill Center in Silver Spring from pancreatic cancer.

James McDermott worked as an IBM executive for 33 years. He died in 2018 aged 88.

Herbert Maisel, the only member of the team without a college degree at the time, went on to teach computer science at Georgetown University. He died in 2019, aged 88.

Roger  Rauschenbusch Baldwin worked as a systems administrator for Union Carbide and the City of New York. He had once confided to the MIT campus newspaper, The Tech, that his knowledge of Blackjack had "ended with the first edition of Beat the Dealer." He died on 10 January 2021 at his home in Riverhead, Long Island. He was 91 and the last surviving member of the Four Horsemen.

See also
Advantage gambling

References

External links
Photographic portraits of Blackjack Hall of Fame inductees
Casino Mathematics, University of Las Vegas Center for Gaming Research
"Optimal Gambling systems for Favorable   Games" by E. O. Thorp, Revue of the International Statistical Institute, Vol.37, No 3 (1969), pp. 273–293

American blackjack players
American gambling writers
American male writers
20th-century American mathematicians
American stock traders
United States Army Corps of Engineers